Claude-Gilles Gosselin (March 12, 1924 – August 18, 2016) was a Canadian politician from Quebec.

Background

Gosselin was born in East Angus and was a stock farmer.

Member of the legislature

Gosselin supported the Union Nationale.  He won a by-election in 1957 and became the Member of the National Assembly of Quebec (MNA) for the district of Compton.

He was re-elected in 1960, but his party lost the election against Jean Lesage's Liberals.  Gosselin supported Jean-Jacques Bertrand over Daniel Johnson Sr. during the party leadership convention held in Quebec City on September 23, 1961.

Gosselin was re-elected in 1962 and 1966, but was defeated in 1970.

Federal politics

He ran as a Progressive Conservative candidate for the district Mégantic-Compton-Stanstead in 1979, but finished a distant third.

Retirement

After he retired from politics, Gosselin had a career in the private sector.

References

1924 births
2016 deaths
Union Nationale (Quebec) MNAs
Progressive Conservative Party of Canada candidates for the Canadian House of Commons
Candidates in the 1979 Canadian federal election